"I Make Hamburgers" is a song by The Whitlams. It was first released to radio in February 1995 as the band's debut single. It was released on CD single in November 1995 as the first single from their second album, Undeniably. 

The song was number 79 in the 1996 Triple J Hottest 100, a ranking of songs voted for by Triple J listeners. It was included on the compilation CD for that year.

Reception
The Guardian said the song was, "the closest to a novelty song the Whitlams have. Hollering 'more sauce!' during live performances ranks up there with 'no way, get fucked, fuck off' in the pantheon of Australian music call and responses. But underneath the fun, it still has heart: a burger-flipping lothario who just likes giving girls the world."

Track listing
"I Make Hamburgers" - 3:36
"I Make Hamburgers" (rebirthed) -3:39
"Sydney 2000 Olympics theme" - 5:00
"Waiting"; 2:48
"Jesus" - 2:02

References

The Whitlams songs
1995 singles
Songs written by Tim Freedman
1994 songs